Lilly Noelle Bartlam (born July 17, 2006) is a Canadian actress. She received two Canadian Screen Award nominations at the 9th Canadian Screen Awards in 2021, in the categories of Best Performance in an Animated Program or Series for her role as Skye in PAW Patrol and Best Performance in a Children's or Youth Program or Series for her role as Kelly Darnell in Detention Adventure.

Originally from Grand Bend, Ontario, Detention Adventure was her first leading role in a live-action role after having been associated primarily with voice roles in animation. Her prior credits have included supporting or guest roles in Creeped Out, The Magic School Bus Rides Again, Esme & Roy, Creative Galaxy and Little People, and starring roles in Total DramaRama and Dot. She is also the guest voice of Hacker's niece, Harmony from Cyberchase. She made her feature film debut in PAW Patrol: The Movie (2021).

Filmography

Television

Film

References

External links

2006 births
Living people
Canadian child actresses
Canadian television actresses
Canadian voice actresses
Canadian web series actresses
People from Lambton County
21st-century Canadian actresses